Noel Barton Blanc (born October 19, 1938) is an American commercial producer and retired voice actor. He is the son of the late cartoon voice actor Mel Blanc.

Early life and career 
Blanc was born on October 19, 1938, in Los Angeles, California. He is the son of voice actor Mel Blanc, and throughout Noel's childhood and early adulthood, he worked with his father on the Looney Tunes voices so that when Mel Blanc eventually retired or died, Noel could take over for his father. In 1961, Noel performed some of Mel's voices, uncredited, when Mel was injured in a car accident. Following his father's death, Noel voiced Elmer Fudd (a character that was originally Arthur Q. Bryan's role that Mel inherited after Bryan's death and occasionally during Bryan's lifetime), The Tasmanian Devil, Porky Pig and other characters in Tiny Toon Adventures; he was one of several successors to his father in the immediate aftermath of Mel's death, with others including Jeff Bergman, Joe Alaskey, and Greg Burson. Warner Bros. had been splitting up the various voice-acting roles to prevent any one of them from being a singular successor. He later contributed voice work to Stewie Griffin: The Untold Story.

On January 29, 1962, Noel and his father Mel formed Blanc Communications Corporation, a media company which remains in operation. Together, they produced over 5000 public service announcements and commercials, appearing with Kirk Douglas, Lucille Ball, Vincent Price, Phyllis Diller, Liberace, and The Who. Kirk Douglas's son Joel Douglas was one of the executives at Blanc Communications Corporation and helped to develop and produce commercials.

Personal life 
Blanc has been married three times; he first married Larraine Zax in 1967; they divorced in 1972. Blanc then married actress Martha Smith in 1977; the marriage lasted for nine years until they divorced in 1986. Blanc married his third wife, Katherine Hushaw, at the Warner Bros. Studios on June 3, 1998.

In February 1991, Blanc was injured in his personal helicopter when the aircraft collided with a small plane above Santa Paula Airport. Two other people were also injured, including Kirk Douglas, and two people in the plane were killed.  Blanc suffered multiple fractures to his right leg, five broken ribs, a bruised lung, and a bruised kidney. He was taken to the intensive care unit at Santa Paula Hospital.

Filmography

Television and film

Documentaries 
 This Is Your Life – Himself
 Roger Rabbit and the Secrets of Toontown – Himself
 50 Years of Bugs Bunny in 31/2 Minutes – Himself, Porky Pig
 Happy Birthday, Bugs!: 50 Looney Years – Himself, Porky Pig
 What's Up Doc? A Salute to Bugs Bunny – Himself
 Entertaining the Troops – Himself
 Behind the Tunes – Himself
 100 Greatest Cartoons – Himself
 The Chuck Woolery Show – Himself
 Vicki! – Himself
 Friz on Film – Himself
 Mel Blanc: The Man of a Thousand Voices – Himself
 King-Size Comedy: Tex Avery and the Looney Tunes Revolution – Himself
 I Know That Voice – Himself

Theme park attractions 
 Tomorrowland – Radio personalities
 Carousel of Progress – Radio personalities

References

External links 
 

1938 births
Living people
20th-century American male actors
21st-century American male actors
American male voice actors
American people of Russian-Jewish descent
Jewish American male actors
Male actors from Los Angeles
21st-century American Jews